Alex M. Davidson (12 August 1876 – 12 July 1951) was an Australian rules footballer who played for the Fitzroy Football Club in the Victorian Football League (VFL).

Early in the 1898 season he moved to North Melbourne in the Victorian Football Association.

Sources

External links

 

Australian rules footballers from Victoria (Australia)
Fitzroy Football Club (VFA) players
Fitzroy Football Club players
North Melbourne Football Club (VFA) players
1876 births
1951 deaths